Armería is a municipality in the south-central part of the Mexican state of Colima. Ciudad de Armería is a city and the seat of Armería municipality. The municipality reported 29,599 inhabitants in the 2015 census and has an area of 341.60 km² (131.89 sq mi). Its municipal seat is Ciudad de Armería.

Climate

Ciudad de Armería
Ciudad de Armería (Armería) is a city in the south-central part of the Mexican state of Colima.  It serves as the municipal seat for the surrounding Armería Municipality. With a 2005 census population of 14,091, Ciudad de Armería is the fifth-largest community in the state in terms of population.

Communities
Armeria has the following communities:
 Los Reyes Zorrillos
 Cofradia de Juarez
 El Paraiso Balneario
 Cuyutlan
 Ninguno Rastro Municipal
 El Bajio
 San Jose
 Rincon de Lopez
 Gerardo Chavez
 Ninguno Club Cinegetico
 Augusto Gomez Villanueva Coalatilla
 El Manguito

Demographics
Although only around 100 Indigenous people, they speak Purepecha and Nahuatl.

Government

Municipal presidents

References

External links
 H. Ayuntamiento de Armería, Col. municipal government web site.
 Armería in the Enciclopedia de los Municipios de México.

Municipalities of Colima